Deewana is a 2013 Indian Bengali romantic action drama film directed by Rabi Kinagi starring Jeet and Srabanti Chatterjee in lead roles. It is a remake of the 2007 Tamil film Deepavali, directed by Ezhil, and starring Jayam Ravi and Bhavana.

Cast
 Jeet as Abhi
 Srabanti Chatterjee as Shruti Roy
 Bharat Kaul as Agnidev Roy
 Arun Bannerjee
 Biswajit Chakraborty as Abhi's father
 Supriyo Datta as binu da
 Tulika Basu
 Mausum

Soundtrack

References

External links
 

Bengali-language Indian films
2010s Bengali-language films
2013 films
Reliance Entertainment films
2010s romantic action films
Bengali remakes of Tamil films
Indian romantic action films
Indian action drama films
2013 action drama films